Övermark is a surname. Notable people with the surname include:

Jarmo Övermark (born 1955), Finnish wrestler
Kari Övermark (born 1956), Finnish wrestler

See also
Overmars

Finnish-language surnames